The Sisterhood Is Global Institute (SIGI) is an international non-governmental organization. For almost three decades, SIGI has been a consultant to the United Nations. 

SIGI was founded in 1984 by Robin Morgan and Simone de Beauvoir. A spinoff of "Sisterhood Is Global", SIGI was the "first international feminist think tank".

Citations

References

Further reading

External links
Sisterhood Is Global Institute home page

Women's rights organizations
Feminist organizations in the United States